This list comprises all players who have participated in at least one league match for Chicago Fire FC since the team's first Major League Soccer season in 1998. Players who were on the roster but never played a first team game are not listed; players who appeared for the team in other competitions (U.S. Open Cup, CONCACAF Champions League, etc.) but never actually made an MLS appearance are noted at the bottom of the page.

A "†" denotes players who only appeared in a single match.

A
  David Accam
  Adaílton
  Mo Adams
  Junior Agogo †
  Alex
  Arturo Álvarez
  Quincy Amarikwa
  Juan Luis Anangonó
  Jalil Anibaba
  Egidio Arévalo Ríos
  Chris Armas
  David Arshakyan
  Michael Azira

B
  John Ball
  Mike Banner
  Orr Barouch
  Chad Barrett
  Brian Bates
  DaMarcus Beasley
  Jamar Beasley
  Pascal Bedrossian
  Austin Berry
  Cuauhtémoc Blanco
  Carlos Bocanegra
  Jonathan Bolaños
  Corben Bone
  Tenywa Bonseu
  Jonathan Bornstein
  Alexandre Boucicaut
  Brandt Bronico
  C. J. Brown
  Scott Buete
  Jon Busch

C
  Samuel Caballero
  Joey Calistri
  Francisco Calvo
  Jonathan Campbell
  Diego Campos
  Jorge Campos
  Craig Capano
  Calen Carr
  Chris Carrieri †
  Nery Castillo
  Diego Cháves
  Matt Chulis †
  Denny Clanton
  Greg Cochrane
  Răzvan Cociș
  Wilman Conde
  Drew Conner
  Jon Conway
  Jorge Corrales
  Scott Coufal †
  D. J. Countess
  Yamith Cuesta
  Jeff Curtin
  Jim Curtin

D
  Sergi Daniv
  Michael de Leeuw
  Christian Dean
  Stefan Dimitrov
  Guly do Prado
  Patrick Doody
  Paul Dougherty
  Dilly Duka
  Andrew Dykstra

E
  Robert Earnshaw
  Raheem Edwards
  Justin Evans

F
  Rodrigo Faria
  Álvaro Fernández
  Collin Fernandez
  Gabriel Ferrari
  Matthew Fondy
  Shaun Francis †
  Guillermo Franco
  Przemysław Frankowski
  Tomasz Frankowski
  Floyd Franks
  Arne Friedrich
  Ryan Futagaki

G
  Nicolás Gaitán
  Dan Gargan
  Eric Gehrig
  Sam George
  John Goossens
  Cory Gibbs
  Gilberto
  Alan Gordon
  Kelly Gray
  Sebastián Grazzini
  Leonard Griffin
  Iván Guerrero
  Diego Gutiérrez
  Jeremiah Gutjahr

H
  Michael Harrington
  Nicolas Hasler
  David Hayes
  Fabian Herbers
  Andy Herron
  Jhon Kennedy Hurtado
  Baggio Husidić

I
  Patrick Ianni
  Sumed Ibrahim
  Zak Ibsen
  Kennedy Igboananike

J
  Chris Jahr
  Nate Jaqua
  Collins John
  Will John
  Daniel Johnson
  Jason Johnson
  Ryan Johnson
  Sean Johnson
  Will Johnson
  Joevin Jones
  Benji Joya
  Hunter Jumper

K
  Johan Kappelhof
  Aleksandar Katai
  Josh Keller
  Stephen King
  Steven Kinney
  Frank Klopas
  Aleksey Korol †
  Roman Kosecki
  Ritchie Kotschau
  Dema Kovalenko
  Krzysztof Król
  Kenneth Kronholm
  Luboš Kubík
  Tony Kuhn

L
  Nick LaBrocca
  Manny Lagos
  Matt Lampson
  Jeff Larentowicz
  Andrew Lewis
  Grant Lillard
  Joel Lindpere
  Freddie Ljungberg
  Peter Lowry

M
  Sherjill MacDonald
  Amos Magee
  Mike Magee
  David Mahoney
  Shaun Maloney
  Justin Mapp
  Marcelo
  Marko Marić †
  Líder Mármol
  Jesse Marsch
  Cristian Martínez
  Julio Martínez
  Brian McBride
  Dax McCarty
  Patrick McLain
  João Meira
  Bruno Menezes
  Djordje Mihailovic
  Josip Mikulić
  Jerson Monteiro
  Jared Montz †
  Jason Moore
  Amando Moreno
  Alex Morrell
  Yura Movsisyan

N
  Cristian Nazarit
  Nemanja Nikolić
  Piotr Nowak
  Mike Nugent
  Patrick Nyarko
  Sanna Nyassi

O
  Dominic Oduro
  Francis Okaroh
  William Oliveira
  David Ousted

P
  Daniel Paladini
  Lovel Palmer
  Pável Pardo
  Davis Paul †
  Logan Pause
  Orlando Perez
  Víctor Pérez †
  Matt Pickens
  Victor Pineda
  Brian Plotkin
  Jerzy Podbrożny
  Matt Polster
  Brandon Prideaux
  Chad Prince
  Gastón Puerari
  Federico Puppo

R
  Damani Ralph
  Rodrigo Ramos
  Ante Razov
  Ľubomír Reiter
  Kyle Reynish
  Michael Richardson †
  Henry Ring
  Bratislav Ristić
  Chris Ritter
  Rafael Robayo
  Dasan Robinson
  Chris Rolfe
  Jordan Russolillo
  Rafael Ramos

S
  Jorge Salcedo
  Tony Sanneh
  Maicon Santos
  C. J. Sapong
  Bastian Schweinsteiger
  Gonzalo Segares
  Dipsy Selolwane
  Harry Shipp
  Florent Sinama Pongolle
  Billy Sleeth
  Chris Snitko
  Tom Soehn
  Luis Solignac
  Mike Sorber
  Bakary Soumaré
  Curtis Spiteri †
  Dan Stebbins
  Michael Stephens
  Jack Stewart
  Hristo Stoichkov
  Greg Sutton

T
  Osei Telesford
  Thiago
  Khaly Thiam
  Wells Thompson
  Zach Thornton
  John Thorrington
  Ryan Tinsley
  Paolo Tornaghi
  Johnny Torres

U
  Deris Umanzor

V
  David Vaudreuil
  Michael Videira
  Brandon Vincent

W
  Billy Walsh
  Paulo Wanchope
  Grant Ward
  Tim Ward
  Austin Washington
  Matt Watson
  Kwame Watson-Siriboe
  Evan Whitfield
  Andy Williams
  Josh Wolff
  John Wolyniec
  Daniel Woolard
  Eric Wynalda

Z
  Jeff Zaun †

Miscellaneous
  Kalin Bankov never appeared in a league match but appeared in a 2001 U.S. Open Cup second round match.
  Nick Noble never appeared in a league match but appeared in a 2008 U.S. Open Cup third round match.
  Pari Pantazopoulos never appeared in a league match but appeared in a 2011 U.S. Open Cup third round match.
  Miguel Saavedra never appeared in a league match but appeared in a CONCACAF Champions' Cup quarterfinal match.
  Tony Walls never appeared in a league match but appeared in a 2012 U.S. Open Cup third round match.

Sources
 

Chicago Fire
 
Association football player non-biographical articles